Anthony Rodriguez is a Republican member of the Florida House of Representatives representing the 118th District, which includes part of Miami-Dade County, since 2018.

History 
Rodriguez was born and raised in Miami, Florida, and attended Miami Sunset Senior High School.

Florida House of Representatives
In 2016, the Representative for Florida House District 118, Frank Artiles, did not run for reelection, opting instead to run for the Florida Senate. In response, Rodriguez and four other Republicans vied for the open seat. Rodriguez lost the primary election to former U.S. Representative David Rivera, with 34% of the vote to Rivera's 36%. Rivera lost the general election to Robert Asencio.

Running again in 2018, Rodriguez was unopposed in the Republican primary. In the general election, Rodriguez won 51.15% of the vote, defeating the incumbent, Democrat Robert Asencio.

Miami Dade County Commission
In June 2021 Rodriguez announced his candidacy to succeed term limited incumbent Javier Souto. Rodriguez faced no serious opposition and winning 56% of the vote in August 2022 wins the seat by default no requiring a second round.

References

Hispanic and Latino American state legislators in Florida
Republican Party members of the Florida House of Representatives
Living people
21st-century American politicians
1980 births
Latino conservatism in the United States